Clovechok is a surname. Notable people with the surname include:

 Andy Clovechok (1923–2016), Canadian professional hockey player
 Doug Clovechok, Canadian politician

See also
 Clover (disambiguation)